"Mama Tried" is a song written and recorded by American country music artist Merle Haggard and The Strangers.  It was released in July 1968 as the first single and title track from the album Mama Tried.  The song became one of the cornerstone songs of his career. It won the Grammy Hall of Fame Award in 1999, and was selected for preservation in the National Recording Registry due to its "cultural, historic, or artistic significance" on March 23, 2016, just 14 days before Haggard's death. In 2021, it was ranked at #376 on Rolling Stone's "500 Greatest Songs of All Time".

Background
In "Mama Tried", Haggard focuses on the pain and suffering he caused his own mother by being incarcerated in 1957 in San Quentin. Haggard ultimately served three years on a robbery conviction.

However, the song is not literally autobiographical, as many country music historians point out. While writer Bill Malone's assessment of the song is in agreement with Ace Collins' (referring to his own experiences that saw him sentenced to prison), Malone points out that Haggard never was sentenced to "life without parole," as the protagonist in the song was. Still, the song's lyrics, and the protagonist's experiences, are heavily influenced by Haggard's early life.

Additionally, Allmusic writer Bill Janovitz notes Haggard's lyrics are sympathetic to his mother, who tried everything in her power to rehabilitate her rebel son. But, as the lyrics point out, "In spite of all my Sunday learning, towards the bad I kept on turning/'Til mama couldn't hold me anymore"; thus the observation, "I turned 21 in prison doin' life without parole."

Malone notes that "Mama Tried" "recalls for us the 1960s California honky tonk and the Merle Haggard sound of those years, featuring the searing electric guitar of Roy Nichols."

Chart performance
Released in July 1968, Mama Tried was Merle Haggard and The Strangers fifth No. 1 song on the Billboard magazine Hot Country Singles chart in August. The song spent four weeks at No. 1, and was his biggest hit to that time.

In popular culture

Haggard's version of "Mama Tried" was on the soundtrack of the 1968 film Killers Three, a film which featured his acting debut.

The words Mama Tried—referring to the song—are shown on Miranda Lambert's shirt in several scenes of the music video Kerosene.

In the 1997 documentary about the making of the film From Dusk till Dawn, known as Full Tilt Boogie, Quentin Tarantino can be seen singing the song with others whilst on the set.

In the 5th-season finale of Gilmore Girls ("A House is Not a Home," 2005), Stars Hollow's "Town Troubadour" is singing the song on a street corner soon after Lorelai brings Rory home from a night in jail.

In the 2008 film The Strangers, the song is used to build tension whilst also referencing the potential poor upbringing of the films' antagonists.  Haggard's own band was also called The Strangers.

In the 2nd series of the 2008 UK television series Survivors, the song is often played and sung by truck driver Billy Stringer.

In 2010, the song was sung as a plot element by Nate Moretta (Kevin Alejandro) to a young incarcerated Hispanic gang member on TNT's Southland season 2 premiere "Phase Three".

In April 2018 it was used in a Fear the Walking Dead Season 4 episode.

The song was referenced by Riley Green in his song "I Wish Grandpas Never Died."

The song was referenced in the chorus of Hardy's song "Redneck Tendencies" featuring Trace Adkins and the late Joe Diffie

Cover versions
The Grateful Dead covered the song regularly, playing it over 300 times live throughout their career, including at Woodstock.

The Everly Brothers covered the song on their 1968 album Roots.

Joan Baez covered the song in 1969, along with another Haggard song, "Sing Me Back Home", though her versions of both songs went unreleased until they were included on her 1993 boxed set Rare, Live & Classic; they later appeared on the 2005 reissue of her 1970 album (I Live) One Day at a Time.

David Allan Coe covered it. It appears on several compilation albums including "Truckin' Outlaw" and "20 Greatest Hits".

The song has been a live standard for Texas alt-country band Old 97's for their entire career, and was recorded for their debut album.

American Oi! band Forced Reality covered the song.  It appears on their Unheard, Unreleased, and Under the Boot compilation.

The Seldom Scene covered the song on their 2007 Sugar Hill Records release, SCENEchronized.

American bluegrass band Greensky Bluegrass have played the song many times at live shows.

Ray LaMontagne includes the song in many live shows.

Comedian Neil Hamburger recorded and released a version on his 2014 LP "First of Dismay".

A demo recording of "Mama Tried" was recorded by Jim Croce. It was released in the 2003 Jim Croce compilation Home Recordings: Americana.

Other recorded versions include:
 Blues man Albert Lee
 Commander Cody of Commander Cody and His Lost Planet Airmen
 Conway Twitty
 Johnny Cash with Merle Haggard and Willie Nelson
 Marty Stuart with John Anderson
 Merle Haggard with Buck Owens and Willie Nelson
 Merle Haggard with Conway Twitty
 Merle Haggard with Ray Price and Willie Nelson
 Merle Haggard with Roger Miller and Bill Anderson
 Merle Haggard with Willie Nelson and Waylon Jennings
 Percy Sledge
 Randy Travis
 Reba McEntire
 The Buckaroos
 The Nitty Gritty Dirt Band
 Toby Keith with Merle Haggard and Willie Nelson
 Troy Cassar-Daley with Adam Harvey
 Willie Nelson
 The Dirty Nil
 Reina del Cid
Clive Gregson and Christine Collister
 Eli "Paperboy" Reed

See also
Momma's Waiting

References

1968 singles
Merle Haggard songs
The Everly Brothers songs
Grateful Dead songs
Jim Croce songs
Songs written by Merle Haggard
Song recordings produced by Ken Nelson (American record producer)
Capitol Records singles
1968 songs
United States National Recording Registry recordings
Songs about mothers